"'Are You Ever Gonna Love Me" is a song co-written and recorded by American country music artist Holly Dunn.  It was released in May 1989 as the first single from the album The Blue Rose of Texas.  Written by Dunn, along with Tom Shapiro and her brother Chris Waters, the song was her first single released by Warner Bros. Records, to which she signed after her previous label, MTM Records, was disestablished.

In August 1989, "Are You Ever Gonna Love Me" became her first (of two) No. 1 songs on the Billboard Hot Country Singles chart. Its 14 weeks spent in the top 40 including a week at No. 1.

Chart performance

Year-end charts

References

1989 singles
Holly Dunn songs
Songs written by Tom Shapiro
Songs written by Chris Waters
Songs written by Holly Dunn
Warner Records singles
1989 songs